John Carlos Baez (born June 12, 1961) is an American mathematical physicist and a professor of mathematics at the University of California, Riverside (UCR) in Riverside, California. He has worked on spin foams in loop quantum gravity, applications of higher categories to physics, and applied category theory.

Baez is also the author of This Week's Finds in Mathematical Physics, an irregular column on the internet featuring mathematical exposition and criticism. He started This Week's Finds in 1993 for the Usenet community, and it now has a following in its new form, the blog "Azimuth".  This Week's Finds anticipated the concept of a personal weblog. Additionally, Baez is known on the World Wide Web as the author of the crackpot index.

Early life and education

Baez was born in San Francisco, California.
He graduated with an A.B. in mathematics from Princeton University in 1982 after completing a senior thesis, titled "Recursivity in quantum mechanics", under the supervision of John P. Burgess. In 1986, he graduated from the Massachusetts Institute of Technology in Cambridge, Massachusetts, with a Doctor of Philosophy under the direction of Irving Segal.

Career
Baez was a post-doctoral researcher at Yale University. Since 1989, he has been a faculty member at UC Riverside. From 2010 to 2012, he took a leave of absence to work at the Centre for Quantum Technologies in Singapore and has since worked there in the summers.

Baez's research includes work on spin foams in loop quantum gravity. He also worked on applications of higher categories to physics, such as the cobordism hypothesis. He has also dedicated many efforts towards applied category theory, including network theory.

Recognition
Baez won the 2013 Levi L. Conant Prize for his expository paper with John Huerta, "The algebra of grand unified theories". He was named a Fellow of the American Mathematical Society, in the 2022 class of fellows, "for contributions to higher category theory and mathematical physics, and for popularization of these subjects".

Blogs
Baez runs the blog "Azimuth", where he writes about a variety of topics ranging from This Week's Finds in Mathematical Physics to the current focus, combating climate change and various other environmental issues.

Baez is also co-founder of the n-Category Café (or n-Café), a group blog concerning higher category theory and its applications, as well as its philosophical repercussions. The founders of the blog are Baez, David Corfield and Urs Schreiber, and the list of blog authors has extended since. The n-Café community is associated with the nLab wiki and nForum forum, which now run independently of n-Café. It is hosted on The University of Texas at Austin's official website.

Family
His uncle Albert Baez was a physicist, a co-inventor of the X-ray microscope, and father of singer and progressive activist Joan Baez. Albert interested him in physics as a child.

John Baez is married to Lisa Raphals who is a professor of Chinese and comparative literature at UCR.

Selected publications

Papers

Books 

 An Introduction to Algebraic and Constructive Quantum Field Theory, with Irving Segal and Zhengfang Zhou, Princeton University Press, 1992.
 Knots and Quantum Gravity, editor, Oxford University Press, 1994.
 Gauge Fields, Knots, and Gravity, with Javier Muniain, World Scientific Press, 1994.
 Towards Higher Categories, editor, with Peter May, Springer, Berlin, 2009.
 Infinite-Dimensional Representations of 2-Groups, with Aristide Baratin, Laurent Freidel and Derek Wise, Memoirs of the American Mathematical Society 1032, Providence, Rhode Island, 2012. 
 Quantum Techniques for Stochastic Mechanics, with Jacob Biamonte, World Scientific Press, Singapore, 2018.

Notes

References 

 Baez, John C. (1996) Spin networks in gauge theory, Advances in Mathematics 117, 253–272
 Baez, John C. (1998) Quantum geometry & black hole entropy, w. A. Ashtekar, A. Corichi & K. Krasnov, Phys. Rev. Lett. 80, 904–907.

External links

Baez's home page at UCR's official website (ucr.edu)
Azimuth blog by Baez
The n-Category Café 
Home page in nLab

Essays
"Should I be thinking about quantum gravity?", essay by Baez at The World Question Center

1961 births
20th-century American mathematicians
21st-century American mathematicians
21st-century American physicists
American bloggers
Massachusetts Institute of Technology School of Science alumni
Princeton University alumni
Yale University fellows
Usenet people
Category theorists
University of California, Riverside faculty
Living people
Loop quantum gravity researchers
American relativity theorists
Higher category theory
American people of Mexican descent
Science bloggers
Mathematicians from California
People from San Francisco
Hispanic and Latino American scientists
Fellows of the American Mathematical Society
Hispanic and Latino American physicists